Komikon (with komik as the Tagalized form for comic, and convention) is an annual comic book fan convention in the Philippines founded by Artist's Den to be the first convention solely dedicated for comic book enthusiasts. The first convention was held at the U.P. Bahay ng Alumni, UP Diliman, Quezon City, on October 22, 2005. Since then, Filipino fans have gathered annually to meet with the country's local talents and exchange common interest in the comic book genre.

The artists who have graced the convention are Gerry Alanguilan, Leinil Yu, Carlo Pagulayan, Edgar Tadeo, Pol Medina, Jr., Carlo Vergara, Carlo J. Caparas amongst other.

Komikon provides avenue for independent publishers to showcase their books in the market, and get feedback from readers and fans. It also provides opportunities for aspiring artists through its various art contests and portfolio reviews conducted by David Campiti of Glasshouse Graphics.

The event also exhibits some artworks of known Filipino comic book illustrators such as Nick Manabat, Alfredo Alcala, Alex Niño, Nestor Redondo, and Tony DeZuniga.

Gallery

References

FilipinoWriter.com article, poster included
Komikon at Inquirer.net
Gerry Alanguilan's 2006 report on Komikon at newsarama.com

External links
Official Komikon site
Artist's Den at DeviantART
2009 Komikon Summer Fiesta coverage

Comics conventions
Arts in the Philippines
University of the Philippines Diliman